DrChrono is an American digital health technology company that provides software and billing services on a platform of web- and cloud-based apps for doctors and patients. The company makes electronic health records (EHR), practice management software, and medical billing software and provides medical revenue cycle management (RCM) services. The company is based in Sunnyvale, California.

History
DrChrono was founded in New York City in 2009 by Daniel Kivatinos and Michael Nusimow. The company spent time in the Rose Tech Ventures incubator in New York City before moving to Silicon Valley to join Y Combinator. Nusimow, a computer engineer, created the program with the intention of streamlining patient-doctor visits. In February 2011, DrChrono launched as an EHR app for the iPad, allowing doctors to complete tasks and access information without needing to use paper records. The information gathered and accessed through the app is also available from a Web browser, iPhone or Android device, on Google Glass and the Apple Watch.

In June 2011, the company released the first tablet EHR system to be certified for meaningful use by Infogard Laboratories. Doctors who used their EHR app to store and track patient data received up to $44,000 in incentives from federal subsidies. In August 2012, DrChrono released OnPatient, an iOS and Android app to replace and expedite the traditional handwritten patient check-in process. It integrates with DrChrono's medical records interface.

As of December 2018, over $3 billion in medical claims are processed annually through the platform, and 13.2 million patients are under the care of DrChrono providers.

In January 2020, the company raised $20 million in a growth capital round from ORIX Growth Capital, a subsidiary of Orix USA, to invest further in the technology platform (EHR, medical billing, and API) and expand engineering, sales, and support functions.

Products and software

DrChrono
DrChrono's EHR platform is built on open source technologies including Linux, Python, MySQL, and Django, atop Apple's iOS platform. In 2013, it opened up its application programming interface (API) so that developers could build apps intended for the physicians and a million patients in its system. DrChrono vets the best apps and features them on its website.

The company makes electronic health records of patients available digitally, as an iOS app on the iPhone, iPad and Apple Watch, and also as an app available on most Android phones. Doctors can customize the interface, schedule appointments, take notes and photos, write prescriptions and send them to pharmacies, look at lab results and update a patient's records. The service offers paid monthly subscriptions for premium services, such as dictation, medical billing software and storage for medical records. Patients can use a version of the app to keep track of their own results and appointments. Its Revenue Cycle Management service helps physicians and medical practices manage billing, collections, accounts receivable, insurance processing and other paperwork. It offers direct integration with Acronis for exchanging large files, as well as a revenue cycle management option called Apollo-plus.

In June 2014, DrChrono created the first health record system app for Google Glass, creating a wearable health record allowing doctors to record patient visits, with the patient's permission, releasing the app in a beta phase. Videos, photos and notes are stored in the patient's electronic medical record or in Box, a cloud-based storage and collaboration service. In April 2015, DrChrono migrated its app to the Apple Watch, which had just been announced. Health records on the iPad, iPhone and Apple Watch sync up together and link to Apple's HealthKit data repository and contribute to the patient's ongoing electronic health record. In September 2016, the company announced its EHR iOS app was the first to be certified for Electronic Prescriptions for Controlled Substances (EPCS), allowing doctors to prescribe electronic prescriptions for controlled substances to pharmacies.

In November 2017, DrChrono became the first EHR to use Apple's facial recognition feature for login, allowing the provider to log in quicker. In April 2018, the company introduced leasing plans to provide medical practices with new Apple hardware. In February 2019, DrChrono's EHR attained ONC certification for Meaningful Use Stage 3, the first to obtain that certification for a mobile-based product, enabling it to share data with other MU3-certified EHRs.

OnPatient
OnPatient is a separate application for patients, offering a range of tools for managing health day-to-day. It offers reminders of upcoming appointments, bill-paying capabilities, and allows for text messaging with health professionals. Following the discontinuation of Google Health in 2011, the data from that program can be imported into OnPatient. The application puts an emphasis on primary data recorded by patients themselves through smartphones and apps. The data is used to find doctors, schedule appointments and send secure messages between patients and professionals. The app is free for patients; full access to OnPatient is part of the paid subscription plan for doctors. It is available on Android or iOS devices.

Partnerships
Many developers have worked with DrChrono to bring include integrated applications to the platform, including CoverMyMeds, FIGmd, Ambra Health, Square, DemandForce, and NextPatient.

In April 2016, DrChrono announced four medical application programming interface partners: Health Gorilla, Inuvio, Medisafe and Wink Health. The partnerships give the DrChrono platform access to US labs for laboratory and imaging orders, streamlined patient data collection, increased access for Medisafe physicians, and integration of sleep studies from a patient's home.

In December 2017, the company partnered with FlexScanMD to help medical practices track inventory. 

In 2019, DrChrono announced numerous partnerships, with companies including:
 CoverMyMeds to help expedite insurance authorization processing;
 Beam Health to allow doctors to conduct smartphone video consultations;
 3D4Medical, to give medical practices access to 3D interactive modeling and animation videos from within their EHR;
 Jamf, to help healthcare practices manage their Apple devices and apps;
 Genomind, to help integrate genetic tests into the app;
 Kapitus, to help healthcare practices secure additional funding;
 DeepScribe, to use artificial intelligence to integrate medical notes directly into their EHR;
 HeathFeed for educational content for providers;
 Updox to consolidate various administrative tasks;
 OutcomeMD, to make it easier to track and analyze patient data.

References

External links 
 

Companies based in Mountain View, California
Health information technology companies
Electronic health records
American companies established in 2009
Health care companies established in 2009
Software companies established in 2009